Tar melanosis is an occupational dermatosis that occurs among tar handlers after several years of exposure, characterized by a severe widespread itching that is soon followed by the appearance of reticular pigmentation, telangiectases, and a shiny appearance of the skin.

See also
Skin lesion

References

 
Disturbances of human pigmentation